Baron Kensington is a title that has been created three times, in the Peerages of England, Ireland and the United Kingdom.

English title (1623)

The first creation came in the Peerage of England in 1623 when the Honourable Henry Rich was made Baron Kensington. He was the younger son of Robert Rich, 1st Earl of Warwick (see Earl of Warwick for earlier history of the Rich family). Henry was made Earl of Holland in 1624. His son, the second Earl, succeeded as 5th Earl of Warwick on the death of his cousin in 1673. These titles all became extinct on the death of Edward Rich, 5th Baron Kensington, 5th Earl Holland and 8th Earl Warwick, in 1759 (see Earl of Warwick for a more detailed description of the descent of the titles). The barony was revived in 1776 for a female-line grandson of the fifth Earl of Warwick (see below).

Irish title (1776)

Lady Elizabeth Rich, only daughter of Robert Rich, 5th Earl of Warwick, married Francis Edwardes, Member of Parliament for Haverfordwest from 1722 to 1725, and the member of a family which owned extensive lands in Pembrokeshire, Carmarthenshire and Cardiganshire. Their son William Edwardes represented Haverfordwest in the House of Commons for over fifty years. He succeeded to the Rich family estates (including Holland House in Kensington, although this was sold to Henry Fox in 1768) on the death of the last of Earl of Warwick and Holland in 1759. In 1776 the barony of Kensington attached to the earldom of Holland was revived when he was made Baron Kensington in the Peerage of Ireland. The first Baron was succeeded by his son, William, the second Baron, who also represented Haverfordwest in Parliament. The second Baron's son, William, the third Baron, served as Lord Lieutenant of Pembrokeshire. The third Baron was succeeded by his son, the fourth Baron.

UK title (1886)
William Edwardes, 4th Baron Kensington, sat as Liberal Member of Parliament for Haverfordwest from 1868 to 1885 and served as a government whip under William Ewart Gladstone from 1880 to 1885. In 1886, he was created Baron Kensington, of Kensington in the County of Middlesex, in the Peerage of the United Kingdom, which gave the holder an automatic seat in the House of Lords up until 1999. His eldest son, the fifth Baron of the Irish Peerage, who now also became the second Baron of the United Kingdom Peerage, served in the Second Boer War and died from wounds received in action in June 1900. He was succeeded by his younger brother, the sixth and third Baron. He was a Colonel in the Territorial Army and also fought in South Africa as well as in the First World War.  the titles are held by his grandson, the eighth and fifth Baron, who succeeded his uncle in 1981.

Baron Kensington, first creation (1623)
 Henry Rich, 1st Baron Kensington, 1st Earl Holland (1590–1649)
Robert Rich, 2nd Baron Kensington, 2nd Earl of Holland, 5th Earl of Warwick (c. 1620–1675)
Edward Rich, 3rd Baron Kensington, 3rd Earl of Holland, 6th Earl of Warwick (1673–1701)
Edward Henry Rich, 4th Baron Kensington, 4th Earl of Holland, 7th Earl of Warwick (1697–1721)
Edward Rich, 5th Baron Kensington, 5th Earl of Holland, 8th Earl of Warwick (1695–1759)

Baron Kensington, second and third creations (1776, 1886)
William Edwardes, 1st Baron Kensington (–1801)
William Edwardes, 2nd Baron Kensington (1777–1852)
William Edwardes, 3rd Baron Kensington (1801–1872)
William Edwardes, 4th Baron Kensington, 1st Baron Kensington of Kensington (1835–1896)
William Edwardes, 5th Baron Kensington, 2nd Baron Kensington of Kensington (1868–1900)
Hugh Edwardes, 6th Baron Kensington, 3rd Baron Kensington of Kensington (1873–1938)
William Edwardes, 7th Baron Kensington, 4th Baron Kensington of Kensington (1904–1981)
Hugh Ivor Edwardes, 8th Baron Kensington, 5th Baron Kensington of Kensington (1933–2018)
William Owen Alexander Edwardes, 9th Baron Kensington, 6th Baron Kensington of Kensington (born 1964)
The heir apparent is the present baron’s son, William Francis Ivor Edwardes (born 1993).

See also
Earl of Warwick (1618 creation)
Earl of Holland

References

Book cited
Kidd, Charles, Williamson, David (editors). Debrett's Peerage and Baronetage (1990 edition). New York: St Martin's Press, 1990, 

Whittakers Almanac (2011)

External links

Baronies in the Peerage of Ireland
Noble titles created in 1776
Baronies in the Peerage of the United Kingdom
Noble titles created in 1886
Noble titles created for UK MPs
Extinct baronies in the Peerage of Ireland
Noble titles created in 1623